Afrogyrorbis natalensis is a species of gastropods belonging to the family Planorbidae.

The species is found in Africa.

References

Planorbidae
Gastropods described in 1848